Ealing Fields High School is a coeducational secondary school, located in the London Borough of Ealing, England. The school site is on a Grade II listed building with a set of new teaching buildings. It was opened as a Free school in 2016 and joined the Twyford CofE Academies Trust in 2017. Ealing Fields is currently rated 'Good' by Ofsted, with Outstanding features.

The school traces roots back to 1903, with the manor building originally used as a Roman Catholic home for girls, later becoming St Anne's Convent School for Girls. The singer Dusty Springfield was a pupil there in the 1950s. There is now a green Ealing Civil Society plaque at the entrance to the school.

History 
Ealing Fields was opened as a Free School in 2016 by a group of parents to provide a new school for South Ealing. Ealing Fields became part of the Twyford CofE Academies Trust on 1 September 2017. Ealing Fields is the smallest of the Trust's schools, with an intake of 150 Year 7 pupils each year.

The creation of Ealing Fields High School involved the refurbishment of a Grade II listed manor and servants' quarters, along with substantial new build elements, to become a new secondary school in West London.

The manor was originally called 'Place House' and was built in the 1600s. Later owners included William and Louisa Lawrence (nee Senior) who were leaders in surgery and botany.

During the building phase, Boris Johnson visited. New buildings consist of a main teaching block and sports hub with community access. The design is in keeping with the existing heritage with large areas of brickwork, portrait windows, and brick piers and detailing around entrances.

Academia 
Each pupil is a member of one of six houses. The house groups are as follows:

  Byron - Red (Lady Byron, Education)
  Chambers - Yellow (Dorothea Chambers, Sport)
  McQueen - Green (Steve McQueen, Media)
  Perceval - Light Blue (Spencer Perceval, Prime Minister)
  Springfield - Dark Blue (Dusty Springfield, Singer)
  Yeats - Purple (W. B. Yeats, Poet)

The houses are named after well-known citizens from Ealing.

Notable alumni 
 Dusty Springfield

External links 
 Ealing Fields High School website

References 

Academies in the London Borough of Ealing
Educational institutions established in 2016
Secondary schools in the London Borough of Ealing
2016 establishments in England
Church of England secondary schools in the Diocese of London